The 16th Youth in Film Awards ceremony (now known as the Young Artist Awards), presented by the Youth in Film Association, honored outstanding youth performers under the age of 21 in the fields of film, television, theater and music for the 1993-1994 season, and took place on March 19, 1995, at the Sportsmen's Lodge in Studio City, California.

Established in 1978 by long-standing Hollywood Foreign Press Association member, Maureen Dragone, the Youth in Film Association was the first organization to establish an awards ceremony specifically set to recognize and award the contributions of performers under the age of 21 in the fields of film, television, theater and music.

Categories
★ Bold indicates the winner in each category.

Best Young Performer in a Motion Picture

Best Performance by a Youth Actor Starring in a Motion Picture
★ Brad Renfro - The Client (Warner Bros. Pictures)
Elijah Wood - North (Columbia Pictures)
Sean Nelson - Fresh (Miramax Films)
Austin O'Brien - My Girl 2 (Columbia Pictures)

Best Performance by a Youth Actress Starring in a Motion Picture
★ Anna Chlumsky - My Girl 2 (Columbia Pictures)
Katherine Heigl - My Father the Hero (Touchstone Pictures)
Alana Austin - A Simple Twist of Fate (Touchstone Pictures)
Zelda Harris - Crooklyn (Universal Pictures)

Best Performance by a Youth Actor Co-Starring in a Motion Picture
★ Matthew McCurley - North (Columbia Pictures)
Michael Conner Humphreys - Forrest Gump (Paramount Pictures)
Eric Lloyd - The Santa Clause (Walt Disney Pictures)
Max Elliott Slade - 3 Ninjas Kick Back (TriStar Pictures)
Roland Thomson - My Girl 2 (Columbia Pictures)
Sean Fox - 3 Ninjas Kick Back (TriStar Pictures)
Matthew Lawrence - Mrs. Doubtfire (20th Century Fox)

Best Performance by a Youth Actress Co-Starring in a Motion Picture
★ Kirsten Dunst - Little Women (Columbia Pictures)
Lisa Jakub - Mrs. Doubtfire (20th Century Fox)
Anna Klemp - Blue Sky (Orion Pictures)
Amy Locane - Blue Sky (Orion Pictures)
Lexi Randall - The War (Universal Pictures)
Claire Danes - Little Women (Columbia Pictures)
Michelle Williams - Lassie (Paramount)

Best Performance by an Actor Under 10 in a Motion Picture
★ Haley Joel Osment - Forrest Gump (Paramount)
Courtland Mead - Corrina, Corrina (New Line Cinema)
J. Evan Bonifant - 3 Ninjas Kick Back (TriStar Pictures)
Milton A. Davis - Angels in the Outfield (Walt Disney)

Best Performance by an Actress Under 10 in a Motion Picture
★ Hanna Hall - Forrest Gump (Paramount)
Whittni Wright - I'll Do Anything (Columbia Pictures)
Alyssa Austin - A Simple Twist of Fate (Touchstone)
Tina Majorino - Andre (Paramount)
Madeline Zima - Mr. Nanny (New Line Cinema)

Best Young Performer in a Film Made for Video

Best Performance by a Youth Actor in a Film Made for Video
★ Courtland Mead - Dragonworld (Paramount)
Michael MacLeod - Secret Adventures (Taweel-Loos and Company)
Chris Wilson - Secret Adventures (Taweel-Loos and Company)
Marcus Andrews - Secret Adventures (Taweel-Loos and Company)

Best Performance by a Youth Actress in a Film Made for Video
★ Marne Patterson - Secret Adventures (Taweel-Loos and Company)
Heidi Lucas - Secret Adventures (Taweel-Loos and Company)
Frankie Ingrassia - Secret Adventures (Taweel-Loos and Company)
Tamara Daniels - Secret Adventures (Taweel-Loos and Company)
Sarah Martineck - Secret Adventures (Taweel-Loos and Company)

Best Young Performer in a TV Mini-Series or Special

Best Performance by a Youth Actor in a TV Mini-Series or Special
★ Wil Horneff - The Yearling (CBS)
Jonathan Hoog - Someone Else's Child (ABC)
Jonathan Brandis - Good King Wenceslas] (Family Channel)
Eric Lloyd - Seasons of the Heart (NBC)
Sam Gifaldi - Where Are My Children (ABC)
Bradley Pierce - Ride with the Wind (ABC)

Best Performance by a Youth Actress in a TV Mini-Series or Special
★ Rae'Ven Larrymore Kelly - Lily in Winter (USA Network)
Courtney Chase - Reunion (CBS)
Ashley Malinger - To My Daughter with Love (ABC)
Holly Marie Combs - A Perfect Stranger (NBC)
Ashley Peldon - Without Warning (CBS)
Olivia Burnette - The Gift of Love (CBS)

Best Young Performer in a Television Series

Best Performance by a Youth Actor in a Drama Series
★ Shawn Toovey - Dr. Quinn, Medicine Woman (CBS)
Devon Gummersall - My So-Called Life (ABC)
Justin Shenkarow - Picket Fences (CBS)
Adam Wylie - Picket Fences (CBS)
Joey Zimmerman - Earth 2 (NBC)

Best Performance by a Youth Actress in a Drama Series
★ (tie) Lisa Wilhoit - My So-Called Life (ABC)
★ (tie) J. Madison Wright - Earth 2 (NBC)
Vinessa Shaw - McKenna (ABC)
Natalie Shaw - Under Suspicion (CBS)
Lacey Chabert - Party of Five (FOX)
Haylie Johnson - Dr. Quinn, Medicine Woman (CBS)

Best Performance by a Youth Actor in a TV Comedy Series
★ Michael Fishman - Roseanne (ABC)
Andrew Keegan - Thunder Alley (ABC)
Jason Marsden - Boy Meets World (ABC)
Johnny Galecki - Roseanne (ABC)
Will Friedle - Boy Meets World (ABC)

Best Performance by a Youth Actress in a TV Comedy Series
★ Brittany Daniel and Cynthia Daniel - Sweet Valley High (Syndication)
Courtney Peldon - The Mommies (NBC)
Larisa Oleynik - The Secret World of Alex Mack (Nickelodeon)
Noley Thornton - The Martin Short Show (NBC)
Angela Watson - Step by Step (ABC)
Ashley Johnson - All American Girl (ABC)
Tatyana M. Ali - Name Your Adventure (NBC)

Best Youth Comedian in a TV Show
★ Marques Houston - Sister, Sister (ABC)
Victor Togunde - Sister, Sister (ABC)
Isaac Lidsky - Summertime Switch (ABC)
Jason Zimbler - Clarissa Explains It All (ep. "Take My Brother's Place") (Nickelodeon)

Best Youth Comedienne in a TV Show
★ Melissa Joan Hart - Clarissa Explains It All (Nickelodeon)
Gaby Hoffmann - Someone Like Me (NBC)
Tia Mowry and Tamera Mowry - Sister, Sister (ABC)
Andrea Barber - Full House (ABC)
Ashley Peldon - The Mommies (NBC)

Best Performance by a Youth Actor in a Daytime Series
★ Courtland Mead - The Young and the Restless (CBS)
Bryan Buffington - Guiding Light (CBS)
Michael Sutton - General Hospital (ABC)
Josh Morrow - The Young and the Restless (CBS)
Bryan Dattilo - Days of Our Lives (NBC)

Best Performance by a Youth Actress in a Daytime Series
★ Maitland Ward - The Bold and the Beautiful (CBS)
Erin Torpey - One Life to Live (ABC)
Rachel Miner - Guiding Light (CBS)
Sarah Michelle Gellar - All My Children (ABC)
Courtney Chase - One Life to Live (ABC)

Best Performance by a Youth Actor - TV Guest Star
★ Christopher Babers - Due South (CBS)
Raushan Hammond - Hangin' with Mr. Cooper (ABC)
Joshua Wiener - Someone Like You (NBC)
Dustin Voigt - Someone Like Me (NBC)
Gabriel Damon - Star Trek: The Next Generation (Syndication)
Erik Alperin - Law & Order (NBC)
Chris Demetral - Lois & Clark: The New Adventures of Superman (ABC)
Wil Horneff - Law & Order (NBC)
Ross Malinger - Dr. Quinn, Medicine Woman (CBS)

Best Performance by a Youth Actress - TV Guest Star
★ Rae'Ven Larrymore Kelly - Sweet Justice (NBC)
Jackie Tohn - The Nanny (CBS)
Azura Bates - Due South (CBS)
Vinessa Shaw - Murder, She Wrote (CBS)
Rachael Bella - ER (NBC)
Kimberly Cullum - Star Trek: The Next Generation (Syndication)
Madeline Zima - Law & Order (NBC)
Sabrina Wiener - Dr. Quinn, Medicine Woman (CBS)
Ivyann Schwan - Bill Nye the Science Guy (PBS)

Best Performance by an Actor Under 10 in a TV Series
★ Ross Bagley - The Fresh Prince of Bel-Air (NBC)
Jon Paul Steuer - Grace Under Fire (ABC)
Andrew Ducote - Dave's World (CBS)
Zane Carney - Dave's World (CBS)
Jake Smollett - On Our Own (ABC)
Benjamin LeVert - Me and the Boys (ABC)
Sam Gifaldi - The Mommies (NBC)

Best Performance by an Actress Under 10 in a TV Series
★ Kaitlin Cullum - Grace Under Fire (ABC)
Yvonne Zima - ER (NBC)
Ashley Peldon - The Mommies (NBC)
Courtney Chase - Blossom (NBC)
Jurnee Smollett - On Our Own (ABC)
Lindsay Felton - Thunder Alley (ABC)
Madeline Zima - The Nanny (CBS)

Best Young Performer in a Voice-Over

Best Performance by a Youth Actor in a Voice-Over - TV or Movie
★ Jason Weaver (duet with Laura Williams) - The Lion King (Walt Disney)
Jonathan Taylor Thomas - The Lion King (Walt Disney)
Ndehru Roberts - Whitewash (HBO)
Adam Wylie - The Swan Princess (New Line Cinema)
J.D. Daniels - The Swan Princess (New Line Cinema)
Ben Diskin - Problem Child (USA Network)

Best Performance by a Youth Actress in a Voice-Over - TV or Movie
★ Laura Williams (duet with Jason Weaver) - The Lion King (Walt Disney)
Larisa Oleynik - The Swan Princess (New Line Cinema)
Adrian Zahiri - The Swan Princess (New Line Cinema)
Alisa Nordberg - The Swan Princess (New Line Cinema)
Sabrina Wiener - Duckman (USA Network)
Serena Henry - Whitewash (HBO)
Haven Hartman - Red Planet (FOX)

Best Young Ensemble Performance

Best Performance by a Youth Ensemble in a Motion Picture
★ The Little Rascals (Universal Pictures) - Ross Bagley, Travis Tedford, Bug Hall, Brittany Ashton Holmes, Kevin Jamal Woods and Juliette BrewerLittle Big League (Columbia Pictures) - Luke Edwards, Billy Sullivan and Miles Feulner
Beethoven's 2nd (Universal Pictures) - Nicholle Tom, Christopher Castile and Sarah Rose Karr

Best Performance by a Youth Ensemble in a Television Series
★ My So-Called Life (ABC) - Claire Danes, Wilson Cruz, Devon Gummersall, A.J. Langer, Devon Odessa and Lisa WilhoitThe Nanny (ABC) - Nicholle Tom, Benjamin Salisbury and Madeline Zima
Kids Incorporated (Disney Channel) - Nicole Brown, Anthony Harrell, Haylie Johnson, Anastasia Horne, Dena Burton, Charlie Brady and Thomas Guiry

Best Family Entertainment

Best New Family Television Series
★ My So-Called Life (ABC)Sister, Sister (ABC)
Earth 2 (NBC)
The Secret World of Alex Mack (Nickelodeon)
Me and the Boys (ABC)

Best Family Film Made for Video
★ Dragonworld (Paramount)Secret Adventures: Snap (Taweel-Loos and Company)
Enchanted Tales (Animated Family Classics/Golden Films)
Secret Adventures: Snag (Taweel-Loos and Company)

Best Family Motion Picture: Comedy or Musical
★ The Lion King (Walt Disney)Beethoven's 2nd (Universal Pictures)
Mrs. Doubtfire (20th Century Fox)
Sister Act 2: Back in the Habit (Buena Vista)
The Santa Clause (Walt Disney)
North (Castle Rock)

Best Family Motion Picture: Drama
★ Lassie (Paramount)Andre (Paramount)
Black Beauty (Warner Bros.)
Crooklyn (Universal Pictures/Spike Lee Productions)
Little Women (Columbia)
The War (Universal Pictures)

Youth In Film's Special Awards

The Jackie Coogan Award

Outstanding Contribution to Youth Through Motion Pictures
★ New Line Cinema - The Swan Princess

The Michael Landon Award

Outstanding Contribution to Youth Through Television
★ Youth Cast and Producers for Home Improvement

Former Child Star - Life Achievement Award
★ Robert Blake - Original "Little Mickey" in The Little Rascals

Outstanding Family Theater Production
★ Dana Lightstone - Chicken Soup

Outstanding Contribution To Youth Through Entertainment
★ Laura Dash - Stunt Artist For Children in Film and TV

Inspiration To Youth Award
★ Scott Cheek

Outstanding International Student Film Award
★ Vickie Oldham - The Clearing

International Music Award
★ Joselito Escobar - "Daddy Kool 'N The Raskals"

Outstanding Youth Actors in a Foreign Film
★ Daniel Guyent and Jehan Pagès - Poussières de vie (Dust of Life)

Outstanding Family Foreign Film
★ Shiro and Marilyn (Japan)

References

External links
Official site

Young Artist Awards ceremonies
1994 film awards
1994 television awards
Youth in Films
1995 in American cinema
1995 in American television